Easton Creek is a short eastward-flowing stream whose watershed originates in Burlingame's foothills in San Mateo County, California, United States. The creek runs south of the Mills Creek and north of the Sanchez Creek watercourses respectively. 

The creek is predominantly underground with storm drains through the hills and residential flatlands of Burlingame, roughly following Canyon Road and Easton Drive. Starting at the Caltrain tracks, towards the former marshlands adjacent the San Francisco Bay, it is culverted or channelized into the bay.

Watercourse gallery

See also
List of watercourses in the San Francisco Bay Area

References

External links
 USGS map of creek
 Google map of the creek

Rivers of San Mateo County, California
Rivers of Northern California
Tributaries of San Francisco Bay